Archips emitescens is a species of moth of the family Tortricidae. It was described from Cho ganh, possibly referring to a location in Vietnam.

References

Moths described in 1930
Archips